Susan Leigh Smith (née Vaughan; born September 26, 1971) is an American woman who was convicted of murdering her two sons, three-year-old Michael and 14-month-old Alexander, in 1994 by drowning them in a South Carolina lake.

The case gained international attention because of Smith's false claim that a black man had kidnapped her sons during a carjacking. Her defense attorneys, David Bruck and Judy Clarke, called expert witnesses to testify that she had mental health issues that impaired her judgment when she committed the crimes.

Smith was sentenced to life in prison with the possibility of parole after 30 years.  According to the South Carolina Department of Corrections, she will be eligible for parole on November 4, 2024. She is incarcerated at the Leath Correctional Institution near Greenwood, South Carolina.

Family background
Smith rarely had a stable home life growing up. Her father committed suicide when she was six years old, and Smith herself attempted suicide at age 13. Her mother then married Beverly Russell, a member of the local chapter of the Christian Coalition, who later was revealed to have molested Smith when she was a teenager. One newspaper claimed that sexual relations between them had continued until six months before the murders.

After graduating from high school in 1989, Smith made a second attempt to kill herself after a married man she was in a relationship with ended their affair. She married David Smith, and they had two sons. The relationship was rocky due to mutual allegations of infidelity, and they separated several times.

Crimes
On October 25, 1994, Smith reported to police that her vehicle had been carjacked by a black man who drove away with her sons still inside. For nine days, she made dramatic pleas on national television for their safe return. However, following an intensive investigation and a nationwide search for them, she confessed on November 3, 1994, to letting her car roll into nearby John D. Long Lake, drowning them inside. Her motivation was reportedly to facilitate a relationship with a local wealthy man named Tom Findlay. Prior to the murders he sent Smith a letter ending their relationship and expressing that he did not want children. She said that there was no motive nor did she plan the murders, stating that she was not in a right state of mind.

Later investigation revealed that detectives doubted Smith's story from the start and believed that she murdered her sons. By the second day of the investigation, the police suspected that she knew their location and hoped that they were still alive. Investigators started to search the nearby lakes and ponds, including John D. Long Lake, where their bodies were eventually found. Initial water searches did not locate the car because the police believed it would be within 30 feet of the shore, and did not search farther; it turned out to be 122 feet from the shore. After the boys had been missing for two days, Susan and David were subjected to a polygraph test. The biggest breakthrough of the case was her description of the carjacking location. She had claimed that a traffic light had turned red causing her to stop at an otherwise empty intersection. However, it was determined that the light would not have turned red for her unless a vehicle was present on the intersecting road. This conflicted with her statement that she did not see any other cars there when the carjacking took place.

Trial
In 1995, David Bruck and Judy Clarke served as co-counsel for Smith. In their opening statement, Clarke argued Smith was deeply troubled and experienced severe depression. Clarke told the jury: "This is not a case about evil. This is a case about despair and sadness." The defense's theory of the case was that Smith drove to the edge of the lake to kill herself and her two sons, but her body willed itself out of the car. The prosecution, on the other hand, believed she murdered her sons in order to start a new life with a former lover. It took the jury only two and a half hours to convict her of murdering them. During the penalty phase, Tommy Pope, the lead prosecutor in the Smith case, argued passionately in favor of sentencing Smith to death. The jury ultimately voted against imposing the death penalty. Smith's defense psychiatrist diagnosed her with dependent personality disorder and major depression.

Incarceration
Smith was incarcerated in the Administrative Segregation Unit in the Camille Griffin Graham Correctional Institution in Columbia, South Carolina.

During Smith's incarceration at the Camille Griffin Graham Correctional Institution, two correctional officers, Lieutenant Houston Cagle and Captain Alfred R. Rowe Jr., were charged after having sex with her. Consequently, she was moved to the Leath Correctional Institution in Greenwood.

She will be eligible for parole in November 2024.

In popular culture 
The season three premiere of Arrested Development ("The Cabin Show") features a flashback scene in which Lucille Bluth (Jessica Walter), having recently gone off her postpartum medication, is watching a news story about Smith, to which she replies "Good for her!"— much to the concern of her son Buster (Tony Hale). The end of the episode features Lucille walking away from her car, with Buster asleep in the back seat as it rolls into a nearby body of water.

A Season 6 episode of Law and Order was based on her case.

Blind Melon's song "Car Seat (God's Presents)", from their 1995 Soup album, was inspired by the Susan Smith murders, as was the Tom House song "I'm in love with Susan Smith". The song "When This is Over", on Hayden's 1995 album "Everything I Long For" is written from the point of view of one of Susan Smith's sons as the car sinks into the lake.

Smith appears briefly in archival footage in the 2002 film Bowling for Columbine in a scene about "dangerous black guys".

See also

 Racial hoax
 Filicide

References

Further reading

South Carolina Law Enforcement Division (SLED); SLED Latent Print and Crime Scene Worksheet: Flotation Characteristics of 1990 Mazda Protege; May 24, 1995

External links
 U.S. News Year in Review – Susan Smith Trial – Dec. 28, 1995 – CNN
 
 Susan Smith SCDOC Inmate Details

Living people
1971 births
1994 in South Carolina
20th-century American criminals
American female murderers
American murderers of children
American people convicted of murder
American prisoners sentenced to life imprisonment
Criminals from South Carolina
Filicides in the United States
People convicted of murder by South Carolina
Prisoners sentenced to life imprisonment by South Carolina
People from Union, South Carolina
People with mood disorders
People with personality disorders
Racial hoaxes